Vipera latastei gaditana is a viper subspecies endemic to southern Spain and Portugal, as well as North Africa. Like all other vipers, it is venomous.

Description
Holotype: MG 1352.99.

Geographic range
According to Saint-Girons (1977), it is found in southern Spain and Portugal, as well as North Africa. McDiarmid et al. (1999) describe the north African part of the range as being the Mediterranean region of Morocco, Algeria and Tunisia.

The type locality is given as "Coto Doñana, Huelva, Espagne".

References

Further reading

Saint-Girons H. 1977. Systématique de Vipera latastei latastei Bosca, 1878 et description de Vipera latastei gaditana, subsp. n. (Reptilia, Viperidae). Revue Suisse de Zoologie 84: 599-607.

External links

 

latastei gaditana
Reptiles of North Africa
Reptiles described in 1977